Roy Franklin (25 December 1892 – 25 July 1950) was an Australian rules footballer who played with Melbourne in the Victorian Football League (VFL).

He married Margaret Jean Hunter in 1916 and was a printer/machinist around that time. Later in life he became a real estate agent.

Franklin was also a member of a Masonic Lodge at Greensborough, Melbourne.

Notes

External links 

 

1892 births
1950 deaths
Australian rules footballers from Victoria (Australia)
Melbourne Football Club players